The William C. Jones House, also known as the Archibald-Tuck House, is a historic structure in Eutaw, Alabama.  The house was placed on the National Register of Historic Places as part of the Antebellum Homes in Eutaw Thematic Resource on April 2, 1982, due to its architectural significance.

References

National Register of Historic Places in Greene County, Alabama
Houses on the National Register of Historic Places in Alabama
Houses in Greene County, Alabama